The 2015 Russian Cup Final decided the winner of the 2015–16 Russian Cup, the 24th season of Russia's main football cup. It was played on 2 May 2016 at the Kazan Arena in Kazan, between CSKA Moscow and Zenit Saint Petersburg.

After being level 1—1 at halftime, Zenit scored three second half goals to emerge victorious with a 4-1 win.

As winners, Zenit qualified for the group stage of the 2016–17 UEFA Europa League and also faced off against CSKA in a rematch of the cup final in the Russian Super Cup held on 23 July 2016.

Match details

References

External links
  Russian Cup on the website of the Russian Football Union
  Department of professional football of the Russian Football Union
  Russian Cup at the RFPL website
  Russia - Cup Finals, RSSSF.com

2016 Russian Cup Final
Cup
Russian Cup
2017
2017
PFC CSKA Moscow matches
FC Zenit Saint Petersburg matches